Lampronia provectella is a moth of the family Prodoxidae. It is found in France, Germany, Switzerland, Austria, Poland, the Czech Republic, Slovakia and Romania. It is also present in Russia east to the Altai Mountains.

The wingspan is 16–19 mm. The forewings are greyish brown with a yellow fuscous sheen and a prominent light tornal spot. The hindwings are somewhat lighter and grey.

The larvae feed on the buds of Rosa species, including Rosa pendulina. Pupation takes place between the shoots of the host plant.

References

Moths described in 1865
Taxa named by Carl von Heyden
Prodoxidae
Moths of Europe
Moths of Asia